The Prater is a large public park in Leopoldstadt, Vienna, Austria. The Wurstelprater, an amusement park that is often simply called "Prater", lies in one corner of the Wiener Prater and includes the Wiener Riesenrad Ferris wheel.

Name

History

The area that makes up the modern Prater was first mentioned in 1162, when Emperor Friedrich I gave the land to a noble family called de Prato. The word "Prater" was first used in 1403, originally referring to a small island in the Danube north of Freudenau, but was gradually extended to mean the neighbouring areas as well. The land changed hands frequently until it was bought by Emperor Maximilian II in 1560 to be a hunting ground. To deal with the problem of poachers, Emperor Rudolf II forbade entry to the Prater. On 7 April 1766, Emperor Joseph II declared the Prater to be free for public enjoyment, and allowed the establishment of coffee-houses and cafés, which led to the beginnings of the Wurstelprater. Throughout this time, hunting continued to take place in the Prater, ending only in 1920.

In 1873, a World Exhibition was held in the Prater, for which a large area of land was set aside, centered on the Rotunda, which burnt down in 1937.

On the grounds of modern-day Kaiserwiese, an attraction called "Venice in Vienna" was established in 1895 by Gabor Steiner. The area included an artificial lagoon to simulate the canals of Venice, Italy.

In 2004, major renovations to the  began, and a new underground railway line was finished and brought into service on 11 May 2008, which includes three stops along the Prater (see Vienna U-Bahn). Wien Praterstern railway station has been in operation for a long time and is only a few dozen metres away from an entrance to the park.

In 2013, the new campus of the Vienna University of Economics and Business was opened next to the Prater.

In 2019, Eliud Kipchoge ran the marathon distance of 26.2 miles laps on a stretch of road in the park in the INEOS 1:59 Challenge. His time of 1:59:40 was the first time anyone had run the marathon distance in under two hours.

Other attractions

The  (main avenue) is the main artery, lined with horse chestnut trees, closed to motorists and known to sports enthusiasts from the annual Vienna Marathon. The  is home to the Liliputbahn, a narrow gauge railway. The  also houses a planetarium and the Prater Museum.

See also
Singer's Midgets

References

External links 

Official Prater site
Liliputbahn miniature railway (in German)
Official Vienna Tourism:  Prater
Prater on Citype
Information: Prater Wien

Parks in Vienna
Leopoldstadt
Tourist attractions in Vienna
World's fair sites in Europe